James Edward Elliott (1891–1939) was an English professional football player and manager.

Career

Playing career
Born in Peterborough, Elliott spent his early career with non-league teams South Weald and Peterborough City, before turning professional in 1912 with Tottenham Hotspur, before later playing for Brentford.

Coaching career
Shortly after his retirement, Elliott became manager of Valencia. He coached the Spanish team between 1927 and 1929 and drove Valencia to the semi-finals of the Copa in 1928.

Elliott was manager of Swedish side AIK between 1932 and 1934. He later coached the Guatemalan national side and Fenerbahçe between 1935–1938.

Career statistics

References

1891 births
1939 deaths
Deaths in Turkey
Sportspeople from Peterborough
English footballers
English Football League players
Tottenham Hotspur F.C. players
Brentford F.C. players
English football managers
Guatemala national football team managers
Expatriate football managers in Guatemala
Association football midfielders
English expatriate football managers
English expatriate sportspeople in Spain
Expatriate football managers in Spain
English expatriate sportspeople in Guatemala
English expatriate sportspeople in Sweden
Expatriate football managers in Sweden
Valencia CF managers
AIK Fotboll managers
Fenerbahçe football managers
Expatriate football managers in Turkey
English expatriate sportspeople in Turkey
South Weald F.C. players